KORM may refer to

KORM-LP, a low power radio station in Corona, California.
KCPL (FM), a non-commercial educational radio station in Astoria, Oregon that used the KORM call sign from 2003 to 2009.